Picrinine is a bio-active alkaloid from Alstonia boonei, a medicinal tree of West Africa.

References

Alkaloids
Methyl esters
Oxygen heterocycles
Nitrogen heterocycles
Heterocyclic compounds with 6 rings